Robert William James (born December 26, 1983) is a former American football linebacker. He was drafted by the Atlanta Falcons in the fifth round of the 2008 NFL Draft. He played college football at Arizona State.

Professional career

Atlanta Falcons
James was selected as a fifth round (138th overall) draft choice by the Atlanta Falcons in the 2008 NFL Draft. He was signed to the Falcons practice squad on September 6, 2009 and was elevated to the 53-man roster on December 29, 2009.

He was waived by the Falcons on October 5, 2010, but was re-signed to the team's practice squad a day later. Atlanta signed him to the active roster for the regular season finale at Tampa Bay where he saw action on special teams.

He was released during final cuts on September 3, 2011, and re-signed to the Falcons' practice squad the following day.  On December 28, 2011, a day after the Falcons placed veteran linebacker Mike Peterson on the injured reserve list, James was signed to the active roster.

James was released by the Falcons during the final cuts after the 2013 preseason.

Baltimore Ravens
James was claimed off waivers by the Baltimore Ravens on September 1, 2013. He was released on September 11, 2013.

Kansas City Chiefs
James signed with the Kansas City Chiefs on December 31, 2013, and appeared in their Wild Card loss to the Indianapolis Colts. He was released on March 6, 2014.

External links
 Arizona State Sun Devils bio

References

1983 births
Living people
Players of American football from Phoenix, Arizona
American football linebackers
Arizona State Sun Devils football players
Atlanta Falcons players
Baltimore Ravens players
Kansas City Chiefs players